The 1911 St. Viator football team represented St. Viator College during the 1911 college football season.  The team compiled a 4–2 record, but were outscored 71 to 47 by their opponents.

Schedule

References

St. Viator
St. Viator Irish football seasons
St. Viator football